Njavalppazhangal  is a 1976 Indian Malayalam-language film, directed by P. M. A. Azeez and produced by M. K. Kunhi Mohamed. The film stars Mohan Sharma, Vidhubala, Sukumari and Balan K. Nair in the lead roles. The film has musical score by Shyam.

Cast
 
Mohan Sharma 
Vidhubala 
Sukumari 
Balan K. Nair 
Kuthiravattam Pappu 
Mallika Sukumaran 
Manju Bhargavi 
Santha Devi

Soundtrack

References

External links
 

1976 films
1970s Malayalam-language films